Segbroek is one of eight districts of The Hague in the Netherlands. The district was established by the city in 1988. Segbroek is divided into five neighbourhoods: Bomen- en Bloemenbuurt, Regentessekwartier, Valkenboskwartier, Vogelwijk and Vruchtenbuurt.

References

External links
  Segbroek on the municipality website

Boroughs of The Hague